Transport in Turkey is road-dominated and mostly fuelled by diesel. Transport consumes a quarter of energy in Turkey, and is a major source of air pollution in Turkey and greenhouse gas emissions by Turkey. The World Health Organization has called for more active transport such as cycling.

Rail transport

Rail network

The TCDD – Türkiye Devlet Demir Yolları (Turkish State Railways) possess 10,984 km of  gauge, of which 2,336 km are electrified (2005).

There are daily regular passenger trains all through the network. TCDD has started an investment program of building 5.000 km high-speed lines until 2023. As of October 2019, three high speed train routes are running: Ankara-Eskişehir-İstanbul, Ankara-Konya and İstanbul-Eskişehir-Konya.

The freight transportation is mainly organized as block trains for domestic routes, since TCDD discourages under 200 to loads by surcharges.

Urban rail

After almost 30 years without any trams, Turkey is experiencing a revival in trams. Established in 1992, the tram system of Istanbul earned the best large-scale tram management award in 2005.  Another award-winning tram network belongs to Eskişehir (EsTram) where a modern tram system opened in 2004. Several other cities are planning or constructing tram lines, with modern low-flow trams.

By 2014, there have been 12 cities in Turkey using railroads for transportation.

 Cities with commuter rail systems: Istanbul, Ankara, Izmir, Gaziantep
 Cities with metro systems: Istanbul, Ankara, Izmir, Bursa, Adana
 Cities with light rail transit systems: Istanbul, Ankara, Izmir, Adana, Bursa, Eskişehir, Konya, Antalya, Kayseri, Gaziantep, Samsun, Kocaeli.

Railway links with adjacent countries

  Azerbaijan – via Georgia – under construction
  Armenia – closed (see Kars Gyumri Akhalkalaki railway line)
  Bulgaria – open – 
  Greece – open –  (Note: Passenger services as Express of Friendship/Filia suspended from 13 February 2012 )
  Georgia – under reconstruction – break-of-gauge /.
  Iran – via Lake Van train ferry – same gauge
  Iraq – No direct link, traffic routed via Syria – same gauge
  Syria – closed –  (Note: It was suspended after breakout of Syrian Civil War in 29 August 2011)

Road transport

Road transport is responsible for much air pollution in Turkey and almost a fifth of Turkey's greenhouse gas emissions, mainly via diesel. It is one of 3 G20 countries without a fuel efficiency standard.   there are many old, inefficient, polluting trucks. Retiring old polluting vehicles by forcing all cars and trucks to meet tailpipe emission standards would reduce disease, especially from polycyclic aromatic hydrocarbons. The Turkish State Railways started building high-speed rail lines in 2003. The Ankara-Konya line became operational in 2011, while the Ankara-Istanbul line entered service in 2014. Opened in 2013, the Marmaray tunnel under the Bosphorus connects the railway and metro lines of Istanbul's European and Asian sides; while the nearby Eurasia Tunnel (2016) provides an undersea road connection for motor vehicles. The Bosphorus Bridge (1973), Fatih Sultan Mehmet Bridge (1988) and Yavuz Sultan Selim Bridge (2016) are the three suspension bridges connecting the European and Asian shores of the Bosphorus strait. The Osman Gazi Bridge (2016) connects the northern and southern shores of the Gulf of İzmit. The Çanakkale Bridge, connects the European and Asian shores of the Dardanelles strait.

 fuel quality and emissions standards are not as good as those in the EU.

Road network

There are three types of intercity roads in Turkey:

– The first is the historical and free road network called State roads (Devlet Yolları) that are completely under the responsibility of the General Directorate of Highways except for urban sections (like the sections falling within the inner part of ring roads of Ankara, Istanbul or İzmir. Even if they mostly possess dual carriageways and interchanges, they also have some traffic lights and intersections.

– The second type of roads are controlled-access highways that are officially named Otoyol. But it isn't uncommon that people in Turkey call them Otoban (referring to Autobahn) as this types of roads entered popular culture by the means of Turks in Germany. They also depend on the General Directorate of Highways except those that are financed with a BOT model.

– The third type of roads are provincial roads (Il Yolları) are highways of secondary importance linking districts within a province to each other , the provincial center, the districts in the neighboring provinces, the state roads, railway stations, seaports, and airports

Motorways: Motorway  3.633 km (January 2023)
Dual carriageways: 28.986 km (January 2023)
State Highways 30.954 km (January 2023)
Provincial Roads 34.113 km  (January 2023)
Motorway Projects‐Vision 8.325 km (in 2053)

As of 2023, there are 471 tunnels (total length 665 km) and 9.660 bridges (total length 739 km) on the network.

Public road transport

There are numerous private bus companies providing connections between cities in Turkey. 
For local trips to villages there are dolmuşes, small vans that seat about twenty passengers.
As of 2010, number of road vehicles is around 15 million. The number of vehicles by type and use is as follows.
 Car	 7,544,871
 Minibus  386,973
 Bus	208,510
 Small truck 2,399,038
 Truck	 726,359
 Motorcycle	 2,389,488
 Special Purpose vehicle 35,492
 Tractor 1,404,872
 Total: 15,095,603

Cycling

Escooters
Escooter rental is available in some cities, and escooters can be used on cycle paths, and on urban roads without cycle paths where the speed limit is below 50 kph.

Car ownership
 over half the registered motor vehicles are cars - about 12.5 million - of which 4.7 million are diesel fueled, 4.7 million LPG, and 3 million gasoline.

Air transport

In 2013 Turkey had the tenth largest passenger air market in the world with 74,353,297 passengers. In 2013 there were 98 airports in Turkey, including 22 international airports. , Istanbul Atatürk Airport is the 11th busiest airport in the world, serving 31,833,324 passengers between January and July 2014, according to Airports Council International. The new (third) international airport of Istanbul is planned to be the largest airport in the world, with a capacity to serve 150 million passengers per annum. Turkish Airlines, flag carrier of Turkey since 1933, was selected by Skytrax as Europe's best airline for five consecutive years in 2011, 2012, 2013, 2014 and 2015. With 435 destinations (51 domestic and 384 international) in 126 countries worldwide, Turkish Airlines is the largest carrier in the world by number of countries served .

Airlines

Airports

Total number of Airports in Turkey: 117 (2007)

Airports – with paved runways
total:
88
over 3,047 m:
16
2,438 to 3,047 m:

1,524 to 2,437 m:
19
914 to 1,523 m:
16
under 914 m:
4 (2010)
(Link:)

Airports – with unpaved runways
total:
11
1,524 to 2,437 m:
1
914 to 1,523 m:
6
under 914 m:
4 (2010)
(Link:)

Heliports
20 (2010)

Water transport

About 1,200 km

Port cities

Black Sea
 Hopa
 Inebolu
 Samsun
 Trabzon
 Zonguldak

Aegean Sea
 İzmir

Mediterranean Sea
 İskenderun
 Mersin
 Antalya

Sea of Marmara
 Gemlik
 Bandırma
 Istanbul
 İzmit
 Derince

Air pollution 
Road traffic is a major source of air pollution in Turkey, and Istanbul is one of the few European cities without a low emission zone.

Transport emitted 85 megatonnes of CO2 in 2018, about one tonne per person and 16 percent of Turkey's greenhouse gas emissions. Road transport dominated transport emissions with 79 megatonnes, including agricultural vehicles.

See also

 Right to Clean Air Platform Turkey
 Public transport in Istanbul
 List of highways in Turkey
Turkish State Highway System
List of otoyol routes in Turkey
Otoyol
List of countries by vehicles per capita Turkey "total number of vehicles" 16th, Turkey "vehicles per capita" 66th

Sources

References

External links